Edax is an Othello-playing computer game, capable of playing the game at expert levels, similar to how others (e.g. Chessmaster) are chess-playing computer games. Edax was written by Richard Delorme in 1998, and continues to be regularly updated. 

Edax’s expert level play is achieved and evolved utilizing various algorithms. Notable among them are: bitboard move generator, negascout tree search, multi-probcut selective search, parallel search using the Young Brother Wait concept, and pattern based evaluation function.  Edax's source code is available under the terms of the GNU General Public License.

References

External links 
 

Reversi software